Barun Napara is a village in Polba Dadpur CD Block in Chinsurah subdivision of Hooghly district in the state of West Bengal, India.

Geography

Location
The area is composed of flat alluvial plains that form a part of the Gangetic Delta.

CD Block HQ
The headquarters of Polba Dadpur CD Block are located at Barun Napara.

Urbanisation
In Chandannagore subdivision 58.52% of the population is rural and the urban population is 41.48%. Chandannagore subdivision has 1 municipal corporation, 3 municipalities and 7 census towns. The single municipal corporation is Chandernagore Municipal Corporation. The municipalities are Tarakeswar Municipality, Bhadreswar Municipality and Champdany Municipality. Of the three CD Blocks in Chandannagore subdivision, Tarakeswar CD Block is wholly rural, Haripal CD Block is predominantly rural with just 1 census town, and Singur CD Block is slightly less rural with 6 census towns. Polba Dadpur and Dhaniakhali CD Blocks of Chinsurah subdivision (included in the map alongside) are wholly rural. The municipal areas are industrialised. All places marked in the map are linked in the larger full screen map.

Demographics
As per the 2011 Census of India, Barun Napara had a total population of 1,628 of which 818 (50%) were males and 810 (50%) were females. Population below 6 years was 153. The total number of literates in Barun Napara was 1,261 (85.49% of the population over 6 years).

Transport
Barun Napara is on Polba-Alinagar Road.

References

Villages in Hooghly district